Screaming Eagles Arena is a multi-purpose arena in Evansville, Indiana. It opened in 2019 and seats 4,800 people for basketball games.

References

Southern Indiana Screaming Eagles basketball
Sports venues in Evansville, Indiana
Sports venues completed in 2019
2019 establishments in Indiana